The Hit is an Irish talent show series that began airing on 26 July 2013 on RTÉ One and sees songwriters showcasing their songs to established artists. The artists then battle one another to find the perfect song they can turn into a hit. It was hosted by Aidan Power and Nicky Byrne.

A pilot episode was aired in September 2012 on RTÉ Two hosted by Laura Whitmore. On 15 March 2013, RTÉ announced that the show had been ordered for a full series to be broadcast in the summer.

On 30 August 2013, Finbar Furey was announced the winner of the series, with the song "The Last Great Love Song". Gerry Fleming, the song's songwriter, won the €20,000 prize. The show wasn't as successful as The Voice of Ireland and was cancelled after one series.

RTVE, the Spanish public broadcaster, was rumoured to be considering using the format as the selection process for its entry in the 2015 Eurovision Song Contest.

Format
In each episode, six chosen songwriters pitch their songs to two established artists in "The Pitching Rooms". The two artists go into each room and listen to the song. Upon exiting the artist can "lock in" their choice or leave the choice open. Each artist must lock in two songs.

The artists meet with both songwriters and discuss possible changes to the song to make it more suitable to the artist releasing the song. The artist produces one song and their choice is revealed when they return to the live show to perform their chosen song.  
 
The two artists then enter a "chart battle" where the song chosen by the artist is available for download. The songs are downloaded using primarily an SMS system and are only available via the system for the week following the broadcast. The song which receives the most downloads goes through to the grand finale, where the songs are performed again with the RTÉ Concert Orchestra and viewers then choose "The Song of the Series", thus "The Ultimate Hit". The winning songwriter receives a €20,000 prize.

Episodes

Pilot (6 September 2012)
Brian McFadden against Royseven

Series 1 (2013)

Episode 1 (26 July)
The Stunning against Julie Feeney

The following week, "Run and Hide" dropped to #77 in the Irish Singles Chart; "New Tattoo" did not chart in the Top 100.

Episode 2 (2 August)
Brian Kennedy against Ryan O'Shaughnessy

The following week, "Who Do You Love?" dropped to #39 in the Irish Singles Chart; "Try" did not chart in the Top 100.

Episode 3 (9 August)
Johnny Logan against Duke Special

The following week, "Prayin'" dropped to #90 in the Irish Singles Chart; "1969" did not chart in the Top 100.

Episode 4 (16 August)
Samantha Mumba against Republic of Loose

The following week "Somebody Like Me" dropped to #58 in the Irish Singles Chart; "Thinking of You" did not chart in the Top 100.

Episode 5 (23 August)
Mundy against Finbar Furey

Grand Finale (30 August)
For the grand finale of the series, the five successful artists returned to perform their song live in the O2, with the RTÉ Concert Orchestra, and the viewers decided who had the ultimate hit via a public vote.

International versions
On 20 November 2013, it was announced that RTL 5 would air a Dutch version of The Hit in early 2014. It began on 24 February 2014, hosted by Dennis Weening. The format has also been sold to China, Germany, Finland, Norway, Russia, Spain and Ukraine.

References

External links
Official website

2012 Irish television series debuts
2013 Irish television series endings
Irish talent shows
Irish reality television series
Singing talent shows
RTÉ original programming